St. Matthew's Anglican Church may refer to:

 St. Matthew's Anglican Church (Namibia)
St. Matthew's Anglican Church (Ottawa)
 St. Matthew's Anglican Church (Toronto)

See also
 St. Matthew's Church (disambiguation)
 St. Matthew's Episcopal Church (disambiguation)